Without Medication Plus MTV "Buzz Live" is the first live album by US singer-songwriter Marcella Detroit, released in 1996 exclusively in Japan. The album did not receive a full commercial release, distributed only on promotional CDs. According to Detroit, whilst in Japan she was asked to be the first artist to perform on a show titled MTV Buzz Live. The album consists of the studio version of "Without Medication", a track from her album Feeler, and the nine performances from the thirteen-piece live concert.

Track listing

References 

1996 albums